CBKF-FM is a Canadian radio station, which broadcasts the programming of Radio-Canada's Ici Radio-Canada Première network on 97.7 FM at Regina, Saskatchewan.

History
The station was launched on April 24, 1975. In 1973, two years prior to the station's launch, the network also purchased two established francophone community radio stations, CFRG in Gravelbourg and CFNS in Saskatoon, and converted them to rebroadcasters of CBKF. The stations were recalled as CBKF-1 and CBKF-2, respectively.

The CFRG calls are now used by a privately owned French-language community station in Gravelbourg operating at 93.1 FM.

A community group in Prince Albert, the Société canadienne-française de Prince Albert, held a separate license to rebroadcast CBKF's programming in that city. The 3,000 watt class B community-owned rebroadcaster CKSF-FM 90.1 has gone off the air to be replaced by Ici Radio-Canada Première's CBKF-FM Regina in 2020.

On May 30, 2013, the CRTC approved the CBC's request to increase CBKF-FM's wattage from 13,700 watts to 22,300 watts, with a decrease in the effective height of antenna above average terrain from 153 to 146.2 metres.

Transmitters

On August 7, 2020, the CBC received CRTC approval to add a new FM transmitter at 90.1 MHz Prince Albert to rebroadcast the programming of CBKF-FM in Regina, Saskatchewan. The new transmitter will also replace CKSF-FM at Prince Albert which was previously owned by Société canadienne-française de Prince Albert, a community-owned rebroadcaster of CBKF-FM Regina. The new call sign become CBKF-FM-6.

References

External links
Ici Radio-Canada Première
 
 
 

Bkf
Bkf
Radio stations established in 1975
Fransaskois culture
Bkf
1975 establishments in Saskatchewan